Vidyadhara (Sanskrit: Vidyadhara; meaning 'Knowledge-holder','Awareness-Holder') is the word in Buddhist literature for a person having the great knowledge (vidya) of mantras and other esoteric knowledge of occult practices such as recitation of spells, samatha, and alchemy. A realized master on one of the four stages on the tantric path of Mahayoga. Another Buddhist definition is: Bearer of the profound method, the knowledge which is the wisdom of deity, mantra and great bliss.

The Rigdzin Dupa, Vidyadharas Gathering, enshrines sacred treaties, revealing the profound views, powerful meditations, sacred conduct and ultimate Vajrayana teachings in Tibetan Buddhism. It is the inner Guru Rinpoche practice from the Longchen Nyingtik, the terma revelation of Jigme Lingpa.

Four levels of a vidyadhara which are specific to the Dzogchen or Nyingma tradition.

 matured vidyadhara
 vidyadhara with power over life
 mahamudra vidyadhara
 spontaneously accomplished vidyadhara

See also 
 Muni
 Rigdzin
 Rishi
 Siddha
 Weizza
 Xian

References 

Vajrayana practices
Buddhist tantras